Gagauzia, an autonomous region of Moldova populated by the Gagauz, an Orthodox Christian Turkic people; has strong bilateral relations with Turkey and acts as a bridge between Turkey, a Turkic country, and Russia, a Slavic and majority Orthodox Christian country.

Background 

The Gagauz have been able to preserve the Gagauz language, to develop an alphabet, to promote their tradition and customs and to achieve their own autonomous territorial formation within the Republic of Moldova in 1994.

Political relations 

Turkey has a Consulate General in Comrat, capital of Gagauzia.

The Chișinău government has tried more than once to defuse what it sees as the “threat” posed by Gagauzi autonomy by electing to take small measures—one slice at a time, and has produced a flurry of assimilationist laws that are incompatible with the 1994 constitution that guarantees Gagauzia’s autonomous statute.

As a response to these challenges to Gagauzia’s autonomy, Mikhail Formuzal, President of People's Assembly in Comrat and head of Gagauzia, is seeking Russia, Turkey and Azerbaijan to defend Gagauz culture and identity.

See also 

 Foreign relations of Gagauzia
 Foreign relations of Turkey

References 

Turkey
Bilateral relations of Turkey